Amos Fortune may refer to:

Amos Fortune ( 1710 – 1801), African-American slave who purchased his freedom
Amos Fortune (comics), DC Comics villain
Amos Fortune, Free Man, 1951 children's novel